Loos may refer to:

Places
 Loos, Nord, France
 Loos-en-Gohelle, France
 Loos, British Columbia, Canada

People
 Loos (surname)

Events
 Battle of Loos, 1915 battle on the Western Front of World War I

See also
Loo (disambiguation)
Los (disambiguation)
Lose (disambiguation)